Goldman Sachs asset management (GSAM) factor model  is one of the quantitative/ factor models used by financial analysts to assess the performance and financial condition of a company. Typically quantitative models are based on inputs obtained from financial statements(FS). There are various types of factor models – statistical models, macroeconomic models and fundamental models. A fundamental factor model uses company and industry attributes and market data known as "factors" to explain a company's historical returns. Since the input factors from FS may be questionable or the data may not be comparable over time this model includes a factor that is based on an assessment by equity analysts performing traditional equity analysis.

Goldman Sachs Asset Management factor model uses the following three measures.
 (A). Value
 i. Book/price
 ii. Retained EPS/price
 iii EBITD/enterprise value
 (B). Growth and momentum
 i. Estimate revisions
 ii. Price momentum
 iii. Sustainable growth
 (C). Risk
 i. Beta
 ii. Residual risk
 iii. Disappointment risk

References

External links
MIT Financial-Management course notes

Fundamental analysis
Stock market
Goldman Sachs
Financial models